Elections for the London Borough of Kingston upon Thames were held on 6 May 2010. The Liberal Democrats retained control of the council with an increased majority of six.

Summary of results

Results by ward

Alexandra

Berrylands

Beverley

Canbury

Chessington North & Hook

Chessington South

Coombe Hill

Coombe Vale

Grove

Barry O'Mahony was a sitting councillor, but for St Mark's ward.

Norbiton

David Ryder-Mills was a sitting councillor, but for Canbury ward.

Sheila Griffin had been elected in 2006 as a Labour councillor.

Old Malden

St James

St Mark's

Surbiton Hill

Tolworth & Hook Rise

Tudor

By-elections: 2010–2014
A by-election was held in Surbiton Hill ward following the resignation of Umesh Parekh.

 

A by-election was held for two seats in Coombe Vale ward following the death of James White and resignation of Robert-John Tasker.

 
 

A by-election was held in Coombe Hill ward following the resignation of David Edwards.

 

A by-election was held in Grove ward following the resignation of Marc Woodall.

 

A by-election was held in Berrylands ward following the death of Frances Moseley.

 

A by-election was held in Beverley ward following the resignation of Derek Osborne.

References

2010
2010 London Borough council elections
May 2010 events in the United Kingdom